Phumeza Theodora Mpushe is a South African politician who has been an African National Congress Member of the National Assembly of South Africa since August 2020. She had previously been a member of the Eastern Cape Provincial Legislature.

Political career
Mpushe was elected to the Eastern Cape Provincial Legislature in the 2014 provincial election as a member of the African National Congress. On 27 February 2018, she was appointed as acting chairperson of the public works committee.

Mpushe was twentieth on the ANC's list of parliamentary candidates from the Eastern Cape for the 2019 general election. She did not win a seat at the election, due to the ANC's electoral performance in the Eastern Cape.

Following the death of Eastern ANC MP Zamuxolo Peter in July 2020, the ANC selected Mpushe to take up his seat in the National Assembly. She was sworn in 14 August 2020. Since becoming an MP, Mpushe has served on the Portfolio Committee on Tourism and the Standing Committee on Auditor General.

References

External links
Profile at Parliament of South Africa

Living people
Year of birth missing (living people)
Place of birth missing (living people)
Xhosa people
People from the Eastern Cape
African National Congress politicians
Members of the National Assembly of South Africa
Women members of the National Assembly of South Africa
Members of the Eastern Cape Provincial Legislature
Women members of provincial legislatures of South Africa